Baltasar de los Reyes, O.S.H., (1606 – 5 May 1673) was a Roman Catholic prelate who served as Bishop of Coria (1673) and Bishop of Orense (1668–1673).

Biography
Baltasar de los Reyes was born in Riaza, Spain, in 1606  and ordained a priest in the Order of Saint Jerome.
On 30 January 1668, he was appointed during the papacy of Pope Clement IX as Bishop of Orense.
On 6 May 1668, he was consecrated bishop by Vitaliano Visconti, Titular Archbishop of Ephesus, with Egidio Colonna (patriarch), Titular Archbishop of Amasea, and Francisco de Rojas-Borja y Artés, Bishop of Ávila,  serving as co-consecrators.
On 30 January 1673, he was appointed during the papacy of Pope Clement X as Bishop of Coria.
He served as Bishop of Coria until his death on 5 May 1673.

References

External links and additional sources
 (for Chronology of Bishops) 
 (for Chronology of Bishops) 
 (for Chronology of Bishops) 
 (for Chronology of Bishops) 

17th-century Roman Catholic bishops in Spain
Bishops appointed by Pope Clement IX
Bishops appointed by Pope Clement X
1606 births
1673 deaths